Eucalyptus pantoleuca, commonly known as round-leaved gum or Panton River white gum, is a species of small tree that is endemic to the Kimberley region of Western Australia. It has smooth, powdery bark, more or less round adult leaves, flower buds in groups of three, white flowers and conical fruit that are glaucous at first.

Description
It has smooth, powdery white bark that is pale pink to pale orange when new. Flowering occurs in July or November and the flowers are white or yellow.

Taxonomy
Eucalyptus pantoleuca was first described in 2000 by Lawrie Johnson and Ken Hill in the journal Telopea from material Johnson collected near 'Tableland' homestead in 1967. The specific epithet (pantoleuca) is from ancient Greek meaning "entirely white".

Distribution and habitat
Round-leaved gum is found along creeks and on hillsides in the Kimberley region of Western Australia where it grows in sandy-loam alluvial soils in low-lying areas or gentle slopes.

Conservation status
This eucalypt is classified as "not threatened" by the Western Australian Government Department of Parks and Wildlife.

See also
List of Eucalyptus species

References

Eucalypts of Western Australia
Trees of Australia
pantoleuca
Myrtales of Australia
Plants described in 2000
Taxa named by Lawrence Alexander Sidney Johnson
Taxa named by Ken Hill (botanist)